The 2017 Ottawa Redblacks season was the fourth season for the team in the Canadian Football League. The Redblacks finished in second place in the East Division with an 8–9–1 record and hosted a playoff game for the third consecutive year. The team lost to the Saskatchewan Roughriders in the East Semi-Final in a season where Ottawa hosted the 105th Grey Cup championship at TD Place Stadium. This was the fourth season with Marcel Desjardins as general manager and Rick Campbell as head coach.

Off-season

Open Tryout Sessions 
On January 15, 2017, the Redblacks announced they would be holding open tryouts across North America during the spring. The dates and locations are listed in the table below:

Coaching Staff 
On December 23, 2016 the Redblacks announced they would be bringing back their entire coaching staff from the previous season.

Retirements 
On January 24, 2017 starting quarterback Henry Burris officially announced his retirement. Burris joined the Redblacks prior to their inaugural season, and was the team's starting quarterback for the franchise's first two seasons, and then again for portions of the 2016 season, eventually leading the team to victory in the 104th Grey Cup game. The retirement pushes Trevor Harris into the starting quarterback role, having acquired him prior to the 2016 season for the purpose of being Burris' successor.

Free-Agency 
The 2017 CFL free agency period officially opened at 12:00pm EST on February 14, 2017. Key transactions are listed below:

Retained

Incoming

Departing

CFL draft 
The 2017 CFL Draft took place on May 7, 2017. The Redblacks made no trades in the draft and selected last in each of the eight rounds by virtue of winning the Grey Cup.

Training camp 
Non-mandatory spring mini-camp was held on April 27–29 at TD Place stadium. Mini-camp focused on quarterbacks, rookies and new signings. Mandatory training camp began on May 28 and will continue through June 14. Training camp consists of 12 practices, 2 walkthroughs and 1 mock game on June 3. Like in previous seasons the sessions of both the mini-camp and training camp were open for the public to view.

Preseason

Schedule 

 Games played with colour uniforms.

Regular season

Standings

Schedule 

 Games played with colour uniforms.
 Games played with white uniforms.

Post-season

Schedule 

 Games played with colour uniforms.

Team

Roster

Coaching staff

References 

2017 Canadian Football League season by team
2017 in Ontario
Ottawa Redblacks seasons